King of Bongo is the third studio album by Mano Negra, released in 1991. The French edition of Rolling Stone magazine named it the 61st greatest French rock album (out of 100).

Track listing

Personnel
Mano Negra
 Oscar Tramor (Manu Chao) – lead vocals, guitar
 Tonio Del Borño (Antoine Chao) – trumpet, vocals
 Santiago "El Águila" Casariego – drums, vocals
 Garbancito (Philippe Teboul) – percussion, vocals
 Roger Cageot (Daniel Jamet) – lead guitar, vocals
 Jo (Joseph Dahan) – bass guitar, vocals
 Helmut Krumar (Thomas Darnal) – keyboards, vocals

Guest musicians
 Anouk – vocals

Charts

Certifications and sales

References

External links
 

1991 albums
Mano Negra (band) albums